The 21st Golden Horse Awards (Mandarin:第21屆金馬獎) took place on November 18, 1984, at Sun Yat-sen Memorial Hall in Taipei, Taiwan.

References

21st
1984 film awards
1984 in Taiwan